Pangani is a suburb of Nairobi.

Pangani traditionally had a large Asian population, who have mostly either emigrated or moved to the more upmarket areas of Westlands and Parklands.

It borders Muthaiga to the north, Ngara to the west, Eastleigh to the east, and Pumwani to the south.

References

Suburbs of Nairobi
Populated places in Kenya
Nairobi